Bythites is a genus of viviparous brotulas found in the Atlantic Ocean.

Species
There are currently three recognized species in this genus:
 Bythites fuscus J. C. H. Reinhardt, 1837 (Arctic brotula)
 Bythites gerdae J. G. Nielsen & Cohen, 1973
 Bythites islandicus J. G. Nielsen & Cohen, 1973

References

Bythitidae
Marine fish genera
Ray-finned fish genera
Taxa named by Johan Reinhardt